István Eiben (21 December 1902 – 23 October 1958) was a Hungarian cinematographer.

Selected filmography
 Oliver Twist (1919)
 Number 111 (1919)
 Hyppolit, the Butler (1931)
 The Old Scoundrel (1932)
 The Verdict of Lake Balaton (1932)
 Flying Gold (1932)
 Judgment of Lake Balaton (1933)
 The Racokzi March (1933)
 And the Plains Are Gleaming (1933)
 Scandal in Budapest (1933)
 Romance of Ida (1934)
 Peter (1934)
 A Night in Venice (1934)
 Everything for the Woman (1934)
 Emmy (1934)
 Spring Parade (1934)
 Villa for Sale (1935)
 Ball at the Savoy (1935)
 Little Mother (1935)
 Half-Rate Honeymoon (1936)
 Fräulein Veronika (1936)
 Where the Lark Sings (1936)
 Mother (1937)
 Number 111 (1938)
 The Woman at the Crossroads (1938)
 Roxy and the Wonderteam (1938)
 Rézi Friday (1938)
 Magda Expelled (1938)
 Azurexpress (1938)
 Marika (1938)
 Landslide (1940)
 One Night in Transylvania (1941)
 Mask in Blue (1943)
 Renee XIV (1946, uncompleted)
 Mickey Magnate (1949)
 Janika (1949)
 A Glass of Beer (1955)

Bibliography
 Cunningham, John. Hungarian Cinema: From Coffee House to Multiplex. Wallflower Press, 2004.

External links

1902 births
1958 deaths
Hungarian film directors
Film people from Budapest
Hungarian Jews
Burials at Farkasréti Cemetery